The men's 6 miles at the 1962 British Empire and Commonwealth Games as part of the athletics programme was held at the Perry Lakes Stadium on Saturday 24 November 1962.

The event was won by the 19-year-old Canadian Bruce Kidd finishing 100 yards ahead the defending champion, Australian Dave Power and Welshmen John Merriman. Kidd crossed the line in 28:26.6 breaking the Commonwealth Games record set by Power in Cardiff by 21.2 seconds. Such was the pace of the race that the top six place getters finished inside the Games record time.

Records

The following records were established during the competition:

Final

References

Men's 6 miles
1962